Morris Plains is a borough in Morris County, New Jersey, United States. As of the 2010 United States Census, the borough's population was 5,532, reflecting an increase of 296 (+5.7%) from the 5,236 counted in the 2000 Census, which had in turn increased by 17 (+0.3%) from the 5,219 counted in the 1990 Census.

Morris Plains was incorporated as a borough by an act of the New Jersey Legislature on March 15, 1926, from portions of Hanover Township, based on the results of a referendum held on April 15, 1926. The borough's name comes from Lewis Morris, colonial governor of New Jersey.

Morris Plains serves as a bedroom community, with many residents traveling to work in New York City. The Morristown Line of NJ Transit provides commuters with direct access to New York Penn Station and to Hoboken Terminal.

Geography
According to the United States Census Bureau, the borough had a total area of 2.59 square miles (6.71 km2), including 2.55 square miles (6.61 km2) of land and 0.04 square miles (0.09 km2) of water (1.35%).

Unincorporated communities, localities and place names located partially or completely within the township include Littleton.

The borough borders the Morris County municipalities of Hanover Township, Morris Township and Parsippany-Troy Hills.

Climate
The climate in this area is characterized by hot, humid summers and generally mild to cool winters.  According to the Köppen Climate Classification system, Morris Plains has a humid subtropical climate, abbreviated "Cfa" on climate maps.

Demographics

2010 census

The Census Bureau's 2006–2010 American Community Survey showed that (in 2010 inflation-adjusted dollars) median household income was $103,688 (with a margin of error of +/− $12,744) and the median family income was $127,614 (+/− $20,257). Males had a median income of $91,908 (+/− $21,398) versus $67,232 (+/− $24,331) for females. The per capita income for the borough was $45,165 (+/− $10,332). About 0.4% of families and 9.5% of the population were below the poverty line, including none of those under age 18 and 0.6% of those age 65 or over.

2000 census

As of the 2000 United States Census there were 5,236 people, 1,955 households, and 1,477 families residing in the borough. The population density was 2,018.7 people per square mile (780.6/km2). There were 1,994 housing units at an average density of 768.8 per square mile (297.3/km2). The racial makeup of the borough was 92.91% White, 1.34% African American, 0.06% Native American, 4.32% Asian, 0.10% Pacific Islander, 0.40% from other races, and 0.88% from two or more races. Hispanic or Latino of any race were 2.69% of the population.

There were 1,955 households, out of which 33.1% had children under the age of 18 living with them, 67.0% were married couples living together, 7.0% had a female householder with no husband present, and 24.4% were non-families. 19.7% of all households were made up of individuals, and 8.6% had someone living alone who was 65 years of age or older. The average household size was 2.63 and the average family size was 3.05.

In the borough the population was spread out, with 23.5% under the age of 18, 4.4% from 18 to 24, 29.4% from 25 to 44, 26.4% from 45 to 64, and 16.2% who were 65 years of age or older. The average age was 41 years. For every 100 females, there were 92.2 males. For every 100 females age 18 and over, there were 86.6 males.

The median income for a household in the borough was $84,806, and the median income for a family was $98,333. Males had a median income of $75,040 versus $44,554 for females. The per capita income for the borough was $36,553. About 1.5% of families and 2.4% of the population were below the poverty line, including 3.0% of those under age 18 and 2.4% of those age 65 or over.

Economy
The borough has been a major base of operations for Pfizer, previously the headquarters for Warner-Lambert. Pfizer has sponsored the Health and Medical Science Academy at Morristown High School and an annual 5k race around Morris Plains.

In 2015, Honeywell moved into a  headquarters on a  campus, after relocating from AlliedSignal headquarters in Morristown.

Government

Local government
Morris Plains is governed under the Borough form of New Jersey municipal government, which is used in 218 municipalities (of the 564) statewide, making it the most common form of government in New Jersey. The governing body is comprised of the Mayor and the Borough Council, with all positions elected at-large on a partisan basis as part of the November general election. The Mayor is elected directly by the voters to a four-year term of office. The Borough Council is comprised of six members elected to serve three-year terms on a staggered basis, with two seats coming up for election each year in a three-year cycle. The Borough form of government used by Morris Plains is a "weak mayor / strong council" government in which council members act as the legislative body with the mayor presiding at meetings and voting only in the event of a tie. The mayor can veto ordinances subject to an override by a two-thirds majority vote of the council. The mayor makes committee and liaison assignments for council members, and most appointments are made by the mayor with the advice and consent of the council.

, the Mayor of Morris Plains is Democrat Jason C. Karr, whose term of office ends December 31, 2022. Members of the Borough Council are Council President Joan Goddard (D, 2022), Art J. Bruhn Jr. (R, 2023), Salvatore F. "Sal" Cortese (R, 2023), Catherine E. "Cathie" Kelly (R, 2024), Nancy Verga (D, 2022) and Dennis M. Wagner (R, 2024).

The Morris Plains Municipal Court judge is Michael A. Carlucci.

Police Department
The Morris Plains Police Department has 17 sworn officers. The command structure has a chief, two lieutenants, five sergeants, nine patrolmen and six civilians.  They are dispatched through the Morris County Communication Center who dispatches for the police, fire and first aid departments. The police department handled over 29,000 calls for the year 2010.

Morris Plains Fire Department
The Morris Plains Fire Association was established on April 28, 1907, after the Weise Hotel Fire of 1906.

Federal, state and county representation
Morris Plains is located in the 11th Congressional District and is part of New Jersey's 26th state legislative district.

 

Morris County is governed by a Board of County Commissioners comprised of seven members who are elected at-large in partisan elections to three-year terms on a staggered basis, with either one or three seats up for election each year as part of the November general election. Actual day-to-day operation of departments is supervised by County Administrator, John Bonanni. , Morris County's Commissioners are
Commissioner Director Tayfun Selen (R, Chatham Township, term as commissioner ends December 31, 2023; term as director ends 2022),
Commissioner Deputy Director John Krickus (R, Washington Township, term as commissioner ends 2024; term as deputy director ends 2022),
Douglas Cabana (R, Boonton Township, 2022), 
Kathryn A. DeFillippo (R, Roxbury, 2022),
Thomas J. Mastrangelo (R, Montville, 2022),
Stephen H. Shaw (R, Mountain Lakes, 2024) and
Deborah Smith (R, Denville, 2024).
The county's constitutional officers are the County Clerk and County Surrogate (both elected for five-year terms of office) and the County Sheriff (elected for a three-year term). , they are 
County Clerk Ann F. Grossi (R, Parsippany–Troy Hills, 2023),
Sheriff James M. Gannon (R, Boonton Township, 2022) and
Surrogate Heather Darling (R, Roxbury, 2024).

Politics
As of March 23, 2011, there were a total of 3,935 registered voters in Morris Plains, of which 853 (21.7%) were registered as Democrats, 1,695 (43.1%) were registered as Republicans and 1,381 (35.1%) were registered as Unaffiliated. There were 6 voters registered as Libertarians or Greens.

In the 2012 presidential election, Republican Mitt Romney received 53.3% of the vote (1,659 cast), ahead of Democrat Barack Obama with 45.9% (1,429 votes), and other candidates with 0.9% (27 votes), among the 3,142 ballots cast by the borough's 4,140 registered voters (27 ballots were spoiled), for a turnout of 75.9%. In the 2008 presidential election, Republican John McCain received 52.3% of the vote (1,725 cast), ahead of Democrat Barack Obama with 45.8% (1,511 votes) and other candidates with 0.8% (27 votes), among the 3,297 ballots cast by the borough's 3,994 registered voters, for a turnout of 82.5%. In the 2004 presidential election, Republican George W. Bush received 55.9% of the vote (1,783 ballots cast), outpolling Democrat John Kerry with 42.8% (1,365 votes) and other candidates with 0.8% (31 votes), among the 3,191 ballots cast by the borough's 3,921 registered voters, for a turnout percentage of 81.4.

In the 2013 gubernatorial election, Republican Chris Christie received 70.8% of the vote (1,399 cast), ahead of Democrat Barbara Buono with 27.9% (551 votes), and other candidates with 1.4% (27 votes), among the 2,025 ballots cast by the borough's 4,122 registered voters (48 ballots were spoiled), for a turnout of 49.1%. In the 2009 gubernatorial election, Republican Chris Christie received 58.6% of the vote (1,337 ballots cast), ahead of Democrat Jon Corzine with 31.5% (719 votes), Independent Chris Daggett with 8.4% (191 votes) and other candidates with 0.4% (10 votes), among the 2,283 ballots cast by the borough's 3,898 registered voters, yielding a 58.6% turnout.

Education
The Morris Plains Schools educate public school students from pre-kindergarten through eighth grade. As of the 2018–19 school year, the district, comprised of two schools, had an enrollment of 578 students and 61.0 classroom teachers (on an FTE basis), for a student–teacher ratio of 9.5:1. Schools in the district (with 2018–19 enrollment data from the National Center for Education Statistics) are 
Mountain Way School with 200 students in grades Pre-K–2 and 
Morris Plains Borough School with 369 students in grades 3–8.

Students in public school for ninth through twelfth grades attend Morristown High School, as part of a sending/receiving relationship with the Morris School District which also serves the communities of Morristown and Morris Township (for grades K–12). As of the 2018–19 school year, the high school had an enrollment of 1,860 students and 133.0 classroom teachers (on an FTE basis), for a student–teacher ratio of 14.0:1.

St. Virgil Academy, founded in 1910, was a Catholic school serving students in preschool through eighth grade (including Pre-K–3 and Pre-K–4) that operated under the auspices of the Roman Catholic Diocese of Paterson. The school was closed at the end of the 2015–2016 school year in the wake of declining enrollment and the rising costs of covering the school's deficits.

Transportation

Roads and highways

U.S. Route 202, New Jersey Route 10 and New Jersey Route 53 are the main highways serving Morris Plains. Interstate 80 and Interstate 287 are both accessible in neighboring Parsippany-Troy Hills Township.

Public transportation
NJ Transit provides service at the Morris Plains station on the Morristown Line to Newark Broad Street Station, Secaucus Junction, New York Penn Station and Hoboken Terminal. The one-story red brick station house, constructed in 1915 in Renaissance Revival style, was added to the National Register of Historic Places on June 22, 1984.

NJ Transit provides local bus service on the 872, 875 and 880 routes, replacing service that had been offered on the MCM2, MCM3 and MCM10 routes until 2010, when subsidies to the local provider were eliminated as part of budget cuts.

TV and movies
 In The Sopranos episode "Made in America", Phil Leotardo is shot to death at a Morris Plains Raceway gas station, located on route 10, before being run over.

Notable people

People who were born in, residents of, or otherwise closely associated with Morris Plains include:

 Darron Collins (born 1970), human ecologist and academic administrator specializing in ethnobotany, who became president of the College of the Atlantic in 2011
 Michael Dogbe (born 1996), defensive end for the Arizona Cardinals
 William Perry Fogg (1826–1909), author and adventurer
 Robert Martin (born 1947), State Senator since 1993 who represents the 26th Legislative District
 Richard Aldrich McCurdy (1835–1916), attorney, business executive and banker during the Gilded Age who served as the President of the Mutual Life Insurance Company of New York from 1885 to 1906
 Charley Molnar (born 1961), former head football coach at the University of Massachusetts Amherst
 Edward Mosberg (1926-2022), Polish-American Holocaust survivor, educator and philanthropist
 Carol Murphy (born 1932), member of the New Jersey General Assembly from 1992 to 2000
 Suzanne Scott (born 1965/66), CEO of Fox News
 Gustav Stickley (1858–1942), furniture manufacturer, design leader, publisher and the chief proselytizer for the American Craftsman style
 Louis A. Thebaud (1859–1939), businessman, sportsman and philanthropist in the Gilded Age
 Jay Webber (born 1972), Assemblyman who has represented the 26th Legislative District since 2008 and had served as Chairman of the New Jersey Republican State Committee
 Elizabeth Weed (born 1940), feminist scholar, editor and university administrator who was the cofounder of the Pembroke Center for Teaching and Research on Women
 Ben Weinman (born 1975), of the band The Dillinger Escape Plan
 Arthur Whitney (1871–1942), politician who served in both houses of the New Jersey Legislature and was the Republican nominee for Governor of New Jersey in 1925
 Paul Zimmerman (born 1932), football sportswriter for Sports Illustrated

References

External links

 Borough of Morris Plains, New Jersey
 Morris Plains Police
 Morris Plains Schools
 Saint Virgil Academy
 
 School Data for the Morris Plains Schools, National Center for Education Statistics
 Morristown High School
 Morris School District
 Daily Record regional area newspaper

 
1926 establishments in New Jersey
Borough form of New Jersey government
Boroughs in Morris County, New Jersey
Populated places established in 1926